PEN1 may refer to:
 Public Enemy No. 1 (street gang)
 Arabidiol synthase, an enzyme